Homaemus proteus is a species of shield-backed bug in the family Scutelleridae. It is found in Central America, North America, and South America.

References

External links

 

Scutelleridae
Articles created by Qbugbot
Insects described in 1862